Clark Terry Plays the Jazz Version of All American is an album by trumpeter Clark Terry featuring performances of music from the Broadway musical, All American recorded in 1962 and originally released on the Moodsville label.

Reception

Allmusic rated the album with three stars.

Track listing
All compositions by Lee Adams and Charles Strouse
 "What a Country" - 4:22 		
 "Same Language" - 4:05 		
 "If I Were You" - 5:00
 "I've Just Seen Her" - 3:50
 "Once upon a Time" - 2:20
 "Nightlife" - 4:34
 "It's Fun to Think" - 5:06
 "The Fight Song" - 3:45

Personnel
Clark Terry - trumpet, flugelhorn
Lester Robinson - trombone
Budd Johnson - tenor saxophone
George Barrow - baritone saxophone
Eddie Costa - piano, vibraphone
Art Davis - bass
Ed Shaughnessy - drums
Oliver Nelson - arranger

References

Moodsville Records albums
Clark Terry albums
1962 albums
Albums recorded at Van Gelder Studio
Albums arranged by Oliver Nelson